Merkendorf may refer to the following places:

Merkendorf, Bavaria, a town in Bavaria, Germany
Merkendorf, Thuringia, a municipality in Thuringia, Germany
Merkendorf, Austria, a municipality in Styria, Austria
 Merkendorf (Schollach), a village in the municipality of Schollach, Lower Austria